Jonathan Monroe Craig (born March 26, 1986) is a Canadian-American singer and songwriter, best known as the former lead vocalist of bands Dance Gavin Dance, Emarosa, Rain City Drive (previously known as Slaves), as well as the co-lead vocalist of the short-lived supergroup Isles & Glaciers. As a solo artist, he has released two studio albums, two EPs and a live album to date, and his distinct type of soul-based singing has earned him considerable acclaim.

Early life
Jonathan Monroe Craig was born in Minot, North Dakota. In a further interview with the music blog Eat Yo Beats, Jonny said "my mom made me listen to tons of shit when I was kid, everything from Michael Bolton to some weird ass Christian rock bands" and also that it was this that became his main influence, rather than gospel music. Craig cites some of his early idols as Boyz II Men and New Found Glory.

He was put into the school choir as a default elective but was ultimately kicked out. As a child, he says that he "had a hard time keeping out of trouble" and that "high school wasn't for him." He would explain later that that was the reason he left high school and attained his G.E.D, then focused on music full-time. "I just wanted an escape from a lot of the things when I was a child I guess. I just wanted to get away from a lot of the problems that I was dealing with at home and stuff", Craig states in an interview with KLSU radio as his reason for starting his path in music.

Music career

Beginnings as a musician (2000–2007)
After moving to America and attending high school in Washington state, Craig auditioned for bands but ultimately was not accepted into one. Craig then formed the band westerHALTS in 2000, a garage band from Tacoma, Washington. At age 15, Craig released his first known song with them titled "Change, Leisure, and Retirement" in 2001. In an Alternative Press Podcast he stated that the band was "...just something to help pay for weed, something I played over the weekends." He then joined as the lead vocalist for Tacoma-based pop punk band Ghost Runner on Third in 2002. Craig said that he met the guitarist of Ghost Runner on Third in high school. He received positive reviews with this band's debut EP, Speak Your Dreams, released on January 4, 2005. AllMusic stated that Craig was, "the band's secret weapon, a passionate vocalist. There's not a bad track to be found here, but Craig tends to outshine his bandmates throughout."

Early on in his career with Ghost Runner On Third it has been cited that overwhelming drug problems led to his departure, as told by Dance Gavin Dance in an old blog post concerning Craig after he was kicked out of the band. Though Craig has denied the statements made, Dance Gavin Dance has not backed off from those remarks, which they explain was the reason for all the band's problems and partly for his former band Ghost Runner on Third. Dance Gavin Dance has also partially blamed guitarist Sean O'Sullivan's departure on Craig's behavior, although there were other contributing factors. Despite their past differences, both past and present members of Dance Gavin Dance have since become friends. Consider the Thief (O'Sullivan's previous band), was also listed in Emarosa's Relativity album on the "special thanks" section of the info-booklet.

Dance Gavin Dance and Emarosa (2007–2012)
Jonny Craig's singing in Dance Gavin Dance's debut EP Whatever I Say Is Royal Ocean and debut full-length album, Downtown Battle Mountain, received positive reviews from critics. Allmusic stated that "co-frontman Jonny Craig's regularly hysterical yelping may change your mind forever."

In March 2007, it was explained that Jonny Craig came up with the name Dance Gavin Dance and had planned to name his previous band, "Ghost Runner On Third", by that name. After being kicked out of Dance Gavin Dance after the "Saints and Sinners Festival" in New Jersey, Jonny Craig immediately filled in for A Skylit Drive's Lead Vocalist  Jordan Blake while he was ill. The band said at shows, and on their website, that he was not the new lead singer and the situation would only be temporary. It had been only two weeks since he quit Dance Gavin Dance in which he joined Emarosa who was left without a lead singer.

On August 18, 2010, Dance Gavin Dance parted ways with vocalist Kurt Travis, and Jonny Craig, along with other original vocalist, Jon Mess, returned to the band to record a new album. The reunited lineup would also embark on a headlining run the following spring. Craig was to remain in Emarosa as well.

The rapper Game and DJ Skee sampled Craig's vocals on the song "Heels & Dresses" from their Break Lights mixtape album, which comes from the song "The Robot With Human Hair Pt. 1." Rapper Bizzy Bone also sampled Craig's vocals on the song "Bottled Up Like Smoke" from his Crossover EP and Crossroads album, using portions of "I Still Feel Her pt. III" from his debut solo album, "A Dream Is a Question You Don't Know How to Answer."

On April 11, 2011, Emarosa publicly announced that Jonny Craig would no longer be a member of the group. According to a statement made by the band, "This decision has been a hard one to make, but we feel it is in the best interest for the band going forward." "Jonny Craig" was the top trending topic on Twitter the day of the announcement.

On August 13, 2012, Jonny Craig was "kicked out" of Dance Gavin Dance yet again for reasons pertaining to Craig being "publicly scolded by the owner of Sumerian Records for multiple offenses". The news surfaced after Jonny released a statement on his personal Twitter.

Isles & Glaciers (2008–2010)
In early September 2008, Chiodos and Cinematic Sunrise vocalist Craig Owens, announced that both he and Jonny Craig would be recording an EP record by the end of the year, also mentioning Vic Fuentes and others.

On December 15, 2008, Alternative Press officially announced and revealed the name and lineup of this new project, Isles & Glaciers. The band's first EP, The Hearts of Lonely People, was produced by Casey Bates in Seattle, Washington, was reworked in April 2009 in Michigan and was released March 9, 2010.

A tweet reading in part "...and people wonder why we won't do another I & G record." was sent out by Craig Owens in 2011, as the MacBook scandal was breaking. This suggests that Isles & Glaciers will be unlikely to release any further albums, at least with a lineup that includes Jonny Craig.

Jonny Craig talked about Isles and Glaciers in an interview stating he would be willing to participate in making a new record, but suspects tension with what he calls, "the more popular people in the group".

Solo work (2009–2014)
Jonny Craig released his debut solo album A Dream Is a Question You Don't Know How to Answer on August 18, 2009, through Rise Records. This is the first individual artist on the label. For promotional purposes he took press photos for the release in late 2009 with photographer Gage Young in Orlando, Florida. He further released three songs on his Myspace profile from the solo album, titled; "Istillfeelher III", "Children of Divorce" and "7 AM, 2 Bottles And The Wrong Road". Craig went on his first solo tour from November through December, supporting acts AFI, Cinematic Sunrise, and then headlining with support from Tides of Man and Sleeping With Sirens. He was headlining a tour with support from Tides of Man and Eye Alaska and will be playing The Bamboozle festival and SXSW.

Craig headlined the "White Boys With Soul" tour with Fight Fair, Breathe Electric, Mod Sun, and The Divine. Craig has also recently revealed that he is recording another solo album. In an interview at Warped Tour with MindEqualsBlown.net, Craig revealed he's attempting to work with Alex Deleon of The Cab on a B-side from his solo album. Craig announced on January 16, 2011 that he would be taking an indefinite hiatus to "pursue the filming of his documentary", stating that all his currently planned records and tours would be canceled. He later added that he would play out the tours with Dance Gavin Dance and Emarosa. On January 21, 2011, Craig announced that he would not actually be taking this hiatus, stating: "hate me all you want people I love what i do and im great at it. IM NEVER GONNA STOP. [sic]" He later stated that he was going to quit because he had been touring and recording "NON STOP" for seven years, and stated "Now i know there's nothing out in the world for me".

Craig was featured in Alternative Press's issue #288 that was released June 5, 2012.

In November 2012, somebody hacked Craig's personal e-mail that contained some demos that circulated on the internet; Craig stated the leaked material will not be on his upcoming solo EP. From Craig's personal Twitter page: "don't trip the songs that leaked are not what my album is going to sound like. that was me just fucking around with some stuff."

Craig set up an account on Indiegogo where fans donated money to produce Craigs upcoming EP. He also confirmed in a recent interview that he has bought out his contract with Rise Records. He released his solo EP, Find What You Love and Let It Kill You, on September 24, 2013, as an independent release.

On November 26, 2013 Jonny has released the Special Edition of Find What You Love And Let It Kill You. The Special Edition includes a new song, which features two people that paid to be on the album from the Indiegogo campaign. He has also released a new song, "Dirty Christmas" which is available also on November 26, 2013. In an interview with rockforevernagazine, Jonny has said he wants to do "maybe one or two more tours(before recording), with me as like a third spot... Maybe a Circa tour?" He also said that his new second album may be coming out next year. He also has stated him and Kyle Lucas are making an album together. On January 15, Jonny stated he was starting a new band. The following day, he tweeted that the band's name would be Slaves. According to Under the Gun Review, along with Craig as lead vocalist, Slaves will consist of guitarists Jason Mays, Alex Lyman, and Christopher Kim, drummer Tai Wright, and bassist Colin Vieira.

Slaves (2014-2019)
Artery Recordings have announced the signing of Jonny Craig's new band, Slaves, which also features members Alex Lyman and Christopher Kim (Hearts & Hands) with Tai Wright (Four Letter Lie). The band have released their debut album in the summer of 2014 via Artery. They've released a short video trailer, which features clips of the new music. The band's debut album entitled Through Art We Are All Equals, was released June 24, 2014 via Artery Recordings. The album features guest vocals from Kyle Lucas, Tyler Carter of Issues and Vic Fuentes of Pierce The Veil. Its lead single "The Fire Down Below" premiered April 22, 2014.

In early 2015, Craig released the albums The Blueprint For Going In Circles, in collaboration with singer-songwriter Kyle Lucas, and The Le Cube Sessions, respectively.

In 2017, Slaves released a new single entitled "I'd Rather See Your Star Explode" along with an accompanying music video. The group's third studio album, Beautiful Death was released on February 16, 2018. An acoustic EP called "Revision" was released on January 18, 2019.

The following Thursday, January 24, 2019, in a message posted on the band's official Twitter account, Slaves announced that they had removed Jonny Craig from the band. The message stated, in part, “We all have struggles in our daily life, but for some, those struggles are personally and physically dangerous. It is no secret that Jonny has battled with addiction in his personal life, sometimes those battles are won, and most recently lost. It's also unfair for a band to rely on someone who just can't rely on themselves. Addiction is a disease, and we hope Jonny gets the help that he needs. Unfortunately, Jonny chose his addiction over the band and left them high & dry while checking in for their international flight while he boarded a plane back home.”

Currently, Jonny Craig remains a solo artist, with his second and most recent solo album release being "The Places We'll Never Be" on September 10, 2021.

Controversies

Internet scam and drug-related issues
In February 2011, several of Craig's fans accused him of being involved in an internet scam. According to the alleged victims, Craig would claim to be selling a used MacBook through his Twitter account. After accepting an online payment on average between 600 and 800 dollars for the product from at least 16 individuals, Craig was reported to have discontinued communication with the buyers, and the people who had purchased the MacBooks never received them. He initially denied the accusations and claimed that his Twitter had been hacked and he had no involvement. However, the following week it was announced that Craig had dropped off his current tour in Emarosa with Chiodos to enter detox in order to treat his ongoing battles with heroin addiction. Rise Records and the Artery Foundation assumed financial responsibility for the internet scam and intended to reimburse anyone who had been victimized. Tilian Pearson, formerly of Tides of Man, substituted for Craig during his absence from Dance Gavin Dance. A public apology was issued by Craig after his detox treatment was completed on March 8, 2011.

In October 2011, Craig was jailed for two counts of possession of narcotics, two counts of possession of drug paraphernalia, and one count of failure to appear on a felony charge with bail set at US$15,000. As a result of this incident, Dance Gavin Dance cancelled their upcoming tour and went on hiatus. Craig was released from jail a few weeks later and was scheduled to enter a court-ordered rehabilitation facility. His follow-up hearing was scheduled for April 30, 2012. Dance Gavin Dance went on with their tour as planned but without Craig. He completed a 30-day court-ordered detox and was released March 30, 2012. 

On April 2, 2014, Craig was accused of using narcotics again by an ex-girlfriend. Craig addressed the issue in a now-deleted video where he took a drug test on screen. He is quoted saying, "just woke up to a nice surprise from the ex. So I'm headed right down to the office to prove to you guys without a doubt I'm not using and that those videos are old. She's crossed a line and needs to get it through her head that this isn't the way you deal with someone not loving you anymore. So let's go! I have nothing to hide".

On April 14, 2016, a few days following Slaves' split, Craig posted an open letter via the band's official Facebook page, confessing that he was continuing to struggle from his addiction and will seek the help he needs following his already booked solo tour. The tour consisted of the US and a few European dates with Slaves (with select members). On May 20, 2016, Jonny announced on Slaves's Facebook page that the band was going through difficult times but had not broken up. Jonny and Colin were the only members remaining at this point.

On January 24, 2019, in a Twitter post made by the official account for Slaves, it was announced that Jonny Craig had been kicked out of the band. The message said in part, "We all have struggles in our daily life, but for some, those struggles are personally and physically dangerous. It is no secret that Jonny has battled with addiction in his personal life, sometimes those battles are won, and most recently lost. It's also unfair for a band to rely on someone who just can't rely on themselves. Addiction is a disease, and we hope Jonny gets the help that he needs. Unfortunately, Jonny chose his addiction over the band and left them high & dry while checking in for their international flight while he boarded a plane back home.” 

The Bristol UK show after this post was cancelled, but the tour resumed with Matt McAndrew, a former contestant from The Voice, as a temporary choice for his replacement. Matt then became their permanent addition, and in 2020 they announced they would be permanently changing their name from "Slaves" after the release of their newest album, further showing their progression as a group.

Sexual assault allegations 
In 2015, Slaves were kicked off the Warped Tour after Craig allegedly sexually harassed a female merchandise worker.

In 2017, numerous ex-girlfriends accused Craig of sexual assault which led to Slaves being dropped from their record label, Artery Recordings, shortly before the scheduled release of their third album Beautiful Death.

In 2019, Craig was accused of sexual assault and domestic violence from his ex-girlfriend, Taylor Nicole Dean, in a video posted to her YouTube channel. Craig threatened his accusers and their family members with legal action. She also accused him of being the one who introduced her to heroin and opened up about the abusive relationship and the dangerous behavior of Craig after and during her recovery and past relationship.

Personal life
In a 2013 acoustic set with music magazine Alternative Press, Jonny Craig explained the story behind his single "Children of Divorce." Craig said his then girlfriend had become pregnant, and after an admission by Craig months later that he didn't love her, she left. He said he never heard from her again and was unable to see his child.

Jonny also has a son with ex-fiancée Sydney England. They revealed their pregnancy on March 27, 2020 and announced their son's birth on July 13 2020. Craig and England's relationship subsequently broke down following a series of intervention from the authorities, including Jonny's arrest for alleged domestic battery, and the admittance of their infant son into child protective custody, where he remains in state care.

In an interview, Craig proceeded to describe himself as an atheist with a Christian background especially in music. He states that all of his music is soulful and has some kind of meaning mainly because his music career began as a child singing gospel music with his church/school. Jonny Craig gives all credit for his musical talent to his grandmother (Ruth Lyons) who he says, "taught me everything I know about music, she was super Christian, super gospel. Her husband was a preacher. She taught me everything I know about music and despite the fact that I may not believe in her beliefs, I believe in what she taught me."

Craig is inspired by soul music, mainly artists Aretha Franklin, Boyz II Men, and Craig David. He has also mentioned Motown acts and the band Mewithoutyou as influences. Craig has performed live covers of the songs "Cry Me a River" by Justin Timberlake, Marvins Room by Drake and "Fuck You" by Cee Lo Green. 

Hollywood Music Magazine stated of Craig, "The guy's a legend and if you've yet to hear him sing you have been missing out."

Discography

Bands
With westerHALTS
 2001: Change, Leisure, and Retirement 
With Ghost Runner on Third
 2005: Speak Your Dreams EP 

With Dance Gavin Dance
 2006: Whatever I Say Is Royal Ocean EP 
 2007: Downtown Battle Mountain 
 2010: Live at Bamboozle 2010 
 2011: Downtown Battle Mountain II 
With Emarosa
 2008: Relativity 
 2009: "Heads or Tails Real or Not (Acoustic)"
 2010: Emarosa 

With Isles & Glaciers
 2010: The Hearts of Lonely People EP 
 2014: The Hearts of Lonely People (Remixes) 
With Slaves
 2014: Through Art We Are All Equals 
 2015: Routine Breathing 
 2018: Beautiful Death 
 2019: Revision (Acoustic EP)

Solo
Studio album
 2009: A Dream Is a Question You Don't Know How to Answer 
 2021: The Places We’ll Never Be 

Extended play
 2013: Find What You Love and Let It Kill You 
 2020: Find Your Home 
Mixtape
 2015: The Le Cube Sessions 

Live album
 Live at Bamboozle 2010 
Collaboration album
 2015: The Blueprint for Going in Circles 

Other songs
 2011: "Lenon Bus" and "Goddamn, I'm Good Lookin' (ft. Metasota)"
 2012: Four unreleased songs were leaked on November; "I Belong Out There", "You're Just Another Whore", "When It Rains It Pours", and "Rhythm in My Soul"
 2013: "Dirty Christmas"
 2014: Four unreleased songs were leaked on April 30; "Attention", "Burning Bridges", "Empty California Winters", and "Fake Love"
 2016: "Back to Life" (Collaboration with Tilian)
Covers
 2013: Cry Me a River - originally by Justin Timberlake
 2013: Best I Ever Had (ft. Stephen Parrish & Kezo) - originally by Drake
 2013: Rehab (Live Session) - originally by Amy Winehouse
 2020: I Met You In The Summer - The 12th Human Feat. Jonny Craig

Guest appearances

References

External link

1986 births
Living people
American atheists
American rock singers
American soul singers
American tenors
Canadian atheists
Canadian emigrants to the United States
Canadian tenors
Canadian rock singers
Canadian indie rock musicians
Canadian male singers
Canadian people of French descent
Canadian people of Scottish descent
People from Abbotsford, British Columbia
Rise Records artists
Singers from Tacoma, Washington
21st-century American singers
21st-century Canadian male singers
21st-century American male singers
Isles & Glaciers members
Dance Gavin Dance members